The Gellénháza Power Plant will be one of Hungary's largest biomass power plants having an installed electric capacity of 142 MW.

References

Biomass power stations in Hungary
Proposed biofuel power stations
Energy infrastructure under construction
Proposed power stations in Hungary